Segregating sites are positions which show differences (polymorphisms) between related genes in a sequence alignment (are not conserved). Segregating sites include conservative, semi-conservative and non-conservative mutations.

The proportion of segregating sites within a gene is an important statistic in population genetics since it can be used to estimate mutation rate assuming no selection. For example it is used to calculate the Tajima's D neutral evolution statistic.

See also 

 Conserved sequence
 Ultra-conserved element
 Sequence alignment
 Sequence alignment software
 ClustalW

References

Population genetics